Johanna Grawunder (born 1961 in San Diego, California) is an American architect, artist, and designer known for her work in lighting.

Her work spans a broad range of projects and scales, from large-scale public installations, architecture and interiors, to limited edition furniture and lights and custom commissions. She also designs products for select companies including Flos, Boffi, and Glas Italia among others.

Notable designs include Robert, the restaurant atop New York City's Museum of Arts and Design, and a lighting installation for the Luxembourg Freeport.

Career 
Grawunder attended California Polytechnic State University in San Luis Obispo, graduating with a degree in architecture in 1984. Soon after, she moved to Italy to study, and began working for Sottsass Associati from 1985 to 2001. She became a partner in 1989. At the Sottsass Studio she was involved primarily with architecture and interiors, co-designing many of the firm's most prestigious projects with Ettore Sottsass. In 2001 she left to found a studio, where she has produced lighting object collections for different lighting companies and designed several private residences worldwide.

Grawunder's lighting work often consists of obscured sources in vibrant colors, which lead to unique and interesting glows.

Grawunder's architectural work and design art objects have been reviewed repeatedly by the New York Times and architectural publications like Dwell and Wallpaper.

Works

Architecture 
With Ettore Sottsass :
 Casa Wolf, Ridgway, Colorado, United-States – 1987-89
 Esprit House, Wels, Austria – 1987–88 with Marco Zanini
 Mayer Schwartz Gallery, Beverly-Hills, Los Angeles, United-States – 1988-1989
 Casa Olabuenaga, Maui, Hawaï, United-States – 1989
 Gallery for the Museum of Contemporary Furniture, Ravenna, Italy – 1992 with Federica Barbiero
 Bruno Bischofberger House, Zurich, Switzerland – 1991-1996
 Casa Yuko, Tokyo, Japan – 1992
 Zhaoqing Golf Club and Resort, Zhaoqing, China – 1994–1996 with Federica Barbiero
 Mourmans House, Lanaken, Belgium – 1995-2002
 Nanon House, Lanaken, Belgium – 1995-1998
 Van Impe House, St Lievens Houtem, Belgium – 1996–1998 with Gianluigi Mutti
 Jasmin Hill, Singapore 1996 – 2000 with Federica Barbiero and Marco Pollini

Interiors 
 BRW & Partners – 1999-2000
 GIPI, Panepinto Showroom, Milan, Italy – 2002
 Beach House, Milan, Italy – 2003-2004
 Casa Enzo Cucchi, Siracusa, Italy – 2006-2007
 HK House, Hong-Kong – 2006-2009
 Casa Rossella, Rome, Italy – 2012-2013
 Casa Côte d’Azur, Monte-Carlo, Monaco – 2015

Industrial Design 
 Crack, Glasitalia – 2014
 Boxy, Glasitalia – 2011
 Colour on colour – 2010
 XXX, Glasitalia - 2009
 WAN, Flos - 2005
 Wedge, Boffi -
 Sunset & Swimming Pool, B&B -
 Jazz Collection, tableware, Mikasa – 2000-2003

Installations and Commissions 
 Daring the Gap, with Konstantin Grcic and Timo Salli, Cologne, Germany - 2001
Motocross, Roppongi-Hills streetscape, Tokyo, Japan – 2006-2007
Percorso Illuminato, Paris, France – 2006, Galerie Italienne, Paris
 Robert Restaurant, Museum of Art&Design, New-York, NY – 2010
 The Singapore Freeport, Singapore – 2010, Galerie Italienne, Paris
 Fendi « Un Art Autre », Tokyo & Beijing – 2013
 5 W's, San Francisco, USA – 2013
 Freeport Luxembourg, Luxembourg – 2014, Ivan Mietton/ IMDA
 Fendi Miami, USA – 2015, Galleria O, Roma
 Lucepiatti, Geneva, Switzerland – 2015

Limited Editions 
 Many Small Works, The Gallery Mourmans – 1995
 Superluminal, Design Gallery Milano and The Gallery Mourmans
 Air Conditioning, Design Gallery Milano – 1995
 Abyss, Salviati – 2003
 Mémoires de Chine, Mourmans Gallery – 1996
 Lighting Management, Post Design Gallery, Milan – 1997
 Fractals, Post Design Gallery, Milan – 1999
 Lowrider, Post Design Gallery, Milan – 2001
 Masks, Gallery Roberto Giustini – 2002
 In The Desert, Design Gallery Milano – 2003
 Arielle, Galerie Italienne, Paris – 2004
 Street Glow, Galerie Italienne, Paris – 2005
 New Positions, Gallery Roberto Giustini – 2006
 Sakura, Roberto Giustini&Partners, Rome – 2007
 I'm Bringing Sexy Back, Designer's Gallery, Köln, Germany – 2008
 Cylinders, Friedman Benda / Afsoun, New-York – 2010
 Giolight, Roberto Giustini&Partners, Rome – 2008
 Davos Dilemma, Roberto Giustini&Partners, Rome – 2008
 Primum Non Nocere, Galleria Antonella Villanova, Firenze – 2011
 Corbubaby, Ivan Mietton/ IMDA, Paris – 2011
 Big Sky, Carpenters Workshop Gallery, Paris London – 2012
 Noguchigogo, Ivan Mietton/ IMDA, Paris – 2013
 DirtyToys, The Workshop Residence, Los Angeles – 2013
 No Whining on the Yacht, Carpenters Workshop Gallery, Paris London – 2013

Unique Pieces 
 Praga, Prague – 2005, Galerie Italienne, Paris
 Sacem, Paris – 2007, Galerie Italienne, Paris
 AA Furniture, Geneva, Switzerland – 2009, Ivan Mietton/ IMDA
 Tempest WS, Private Yacht – 2009–2010, Ivan Mietton/ IMDA
 MLJ Furniture, Paris, France – 2009, Ivan Mietton/ IMDA
 LB Ceiling Lights, Paris, France – 2010, Ivan Mietton/ IMDA
 Wind Ceiling Light, Saint Martin de Belleville, France – 2010, Ivan Mietton/ IMDA
 Giant Circle Game and Crystal Lights, London, UK – 2010, Ivan Mietton/ IMDA
 Joos Light, Saint-Moritz, Switzerland – 2011
 Park Avenue Lighting Furniture, NYC – 2012, Ivan Mietton/ IMDA
 New-York Flat Screens, NYC – 2013
 Kalligraphy Light, Paris, France – 2013, Ivan Mietton/ IMDA
 Chopi Chopi, Private Yacht – 2013, Ivan Mietton/ IMDA
 Giant Circle Game Light, Beyrouth, Lebanon – 2014, Ivan Mietton/ IMDA
 The Jay Z Light, Paris, France – 2014, Ivan Mietton/ IMDA
 Madame Kate, Private Yacht – 2014, Ivan Mietton/ IMDA
 Magic Cloud – 2015
 Chanel Gold Bar, Madrid, Spain – 2015, Carpenters Workshop Gallery
 Slab Table, London, UK – 2016, Ivan Mietton/ IMDA

Publications 
 Foreign Policy, Recent International Light and Design Projects , Marie-Laure Jousset, Galerie Italienne Edition 2007
 Ettore Sottsass Big and Small Works, Johanna Grawunder Many Small Works , Gallery Mourmans Edition, 1995

Museums and awards 
Her work has been shown and is included in many Museum permanent collections, including
 LACMA, Los Angeles
 Musée des Arts Décoratifs, Paris
 FNAC, Paris
 San Francisco MOMA
 Art Institute of Chicago
Museum of Fine Arts, Houston
High Museum of Atlanta

In 2012, she won the WALLPAPER* Design Award " best use of colour " for the Boxy table made by Glasitalia and in 2010 " best lit lunch " for the lighting installation at Robert, Museum of Art and Design, New-York.

References

External links 
 Johanna Grawunder Studio

1961 births
Living people
California Polytechnic State University alumni
21st-century American architects